Bagikla is a rural locality (a selo) in Kuminsky Selsoviet, Laksky District, Republic of Dagestan, Russia. The population was 85 as of 2010. There is 1 street.

Geography 
Bagikla is located 16 km north of Kumukh (the district's administrative centre) by road, on the Kazikumukhskoye Koysu River. Kuma and Shakhuva are the nearest rural localities.

Nationalities 
Laks live there.

References 

Rural localities in Laksky District